The Tomark Skyper GT9 is a Slovakian ultralight and light-sport aircraft, designed and produced by Tomark of Prešov, introduced in 2014. The aircraft is supplied complete and ready-to-fly.

Design and development
The Skyper GT9 was designed to comply with the Fédération Aéronautique Internationale microlight rules and US light-sport aircraft rules and complies with the Czech UL2-1 and ELSA as well as German LTF-UL rules. It was designed for the flight training and touring roles. It features a strut-braced high-wing, an enclosed cabin with two-seats-in-side-by-side configuration accessed by doors, fixed tricycle landing gear and a single engine in tractor configuration.

The aircraft is made from aluminum sheet and has a round fuselage profile. Standard engines available are the   Rotax 912ULS and 912iS four-stroke powerplants.

As of March 2017, the design does not appear on the Federal Aviation Administration's list of approved special light-sport aircraft.

Operational history
Reviewer Marino Boric described the design in a 2015 review as "ideal for cross country travel".

Specifications (Skyper GT9 UL)

See also
Tomark Viper

References

External links

Skyper
2010s Slovak ultralight aircraft
Light-sport aircraft
Single-engined tractor aircraft
High-wing aircraft